Zaleski (feminine Zaleska, plural Zalescy) is a Polish surname. At the beginning of the 1990s there were approximately 4322 people in Poland with this surname. Notable people with the surname include:

 Alexander M. Zaleski (1906-1975), U.S. Catholic Bishop
 Anthony Florian Zaleski (1913–1997), American two-time world middleweight boxing champion
 August Zaleski (1883–1972), Polish diplomat, historian, President of Poland in Exile
 Bronisław Zaleski (1819 or 1820–1880), Polish writer
 Carol Zaleski, American author, professor of religious studies
 Jan Zaleski (1869–1932), Polish biochemist
  (1926–1981), Polish philologist, historian of language, numismatist
 Jerod Zaleski (born 1989), Canadian football player
 Józef Bohdan Zaleski (1802–1886), Polish poet
 Krzysztof Zaleski, Polish actor
 Ladislaus Michael Zaleski (1852–1925), Polish prelate, Apostolic Delegate to the East-Indies and Latin Patriarch of Antioch, botanist
 Leon Zaleski (c. 1810–1841), Polish patriotic activist
 Marcin Zaleski (1796–1877), Polish painter
 Michał Zaleski (born 1952), Polish politician
 Philip Zaleski, American writer and editor
 Terence M. Zaleski (born 1953), American politician
 Wacław Michał Zaleski (pseudonym Wacław from Olesko; 1799–1849), Polish poet, researcher of folklore
 Wojciech Zaleski (1906–1961), Polish politician
 Zbigniew Zaleski (born 1947), Polish politician
 Zygmunt Zaleski (1882–1967), Polish literature historian, poet

See also
 Zaleski, Ohio, village in the United States
 Zalewski
 Jim Zalesky, American college wrestling coach

References

Polish-language surnames